The Wagner–Peyser Act (P.L. 73–30) is a United States federal law that "established a nationwide system of public employment offices, known as the Employment Service." The law was later amended many times, especially by the Workforce Investment Act of 1998.

The law was named for its congressional sponsors, Sen. Robert F. Wagner (D-New York) and Rep. Theodore A. Peyser (D-New York). As part of the New Deal, President Franklin D. Roosevelt signed the act into law on June 6, 1933, at the White House.

References

External links 
 Wagner-Peyser Act (PDF/details) as amended in the GPO Statute Compilations collection

1933 in law
United States federal labor legislation
73rd United States Congress
United States federal legislation articles without infoboxes
Public employment service